Leiopotherapon is a genus of fish in the family Terapontidae, the grunters. Three species are endemic to Australia, while L. plumbeus is from the Philippines. They are mainly found in fresh water, although H. unicolor also occurs in desert lakes with higher salinity.

Species include:
Leiopotherapon aheneus (Mees, 1963) - Fortescue grunter
Leiopotherapon macrolepis (Vari, 1978) - large-scale grunter
Leiopotherapon plumbeus (Kner, 1864) - silver perch
Leiopotherapon unicolor (Günther, 1859) - spangled grunter, spangled perch

References

 
Terapontidae

 
Taxonomy articles created by Polbot